Bruce Hung (born 7 September 1990) is a Taiwanese actor. He is known for his starring role in the 2014 film Café. Waiting. Love.

Filmography

Film

Television

References

External links 
 
 
 
 

21st-century Taiwanese male actors
1990 births
Living people
Taiwanese male film actors
Taiwanese male television actors
Male actors from Kaohsiung